New Afghanistan Party (Hezb-e Afghanistan Naween or Naveen) is a political party in Afghanistan led by Yunus Qanuni. The party was founded in 2004, as Qanuni moved away from the National Movement of Afghanistan.

In April 2005 Qanuni took the initiative to form the National Understanding Front of Afghanistan as a broad opposition alliance. The front did however become inactive after a couple of months. In December 2005 an agreement was reached between Qanuni and Burhanuddin Rabbani, and the party and a section of the National Movement of Afghanistan would merge into Jamiat-e Islami. By 2006 there were conflicting reports on whether the merger had actually been effective.

Electoral history

Presidential elections

National Assembly elections

References

Program for Culture and Conflict Studies. Wardak. US Naval Postgraduate School. Last updated 23 January 2009.

Political parties in Afghanistan